Last Summer is a 2021 Turkish romantic drama film directed by Ozan Açıktan, written by Ozan Açıktan and Sami Berat Marçali and starring Ece Çeşmioğlu, Aslıhan Malbora and Halit Özgür Sarı.

Cast 
 Fatih Berk Şahin
 Ece Çeşmioğlu
 Aslıhan Malbora
 Halit Özgür Sarı
 Eren Ören 
 Ozan Kaya Oktu
 Talha Öztürk
 Sümeyye Aydoğan
 Merve Nur Bengi
 Kubilay Tunçer
 Süreyya Güzel
 Eray Ertüren

References

External links
 
 

2021 films
2021 romantic drama films
2020s Turkish-language films
Turkish-language Netflix original films
Turkish romantic drama films
Films about vacationing